Ntokozo Mzamomuhle Vidima (born 13 May 1995) is a South African rugby union player for the  in the Currie Cup. His regular position is flanker or lock.

Rugby career

2013: Schoolboy rugby

Vidima was born in Durban, where he attended Glenwood High School. He also played for Sharks U19 while in Glenwood high school.

2015–2016: Free State Under-21, UFS Shimlas and Free State XV

His side finished second on the log to qualify for the play-offs, and he also played off the bench in their 27–22 win over the s in the semi-final and in their 17–52 defeat to Western Province U21 in the final.

In the first quarter of 2016, Vidima played Varsity Cup rugby with university side . He was named in the matchday squad for all seven matches, making four starts and playing off the bench on two occasions. It was a disappointing season for UFS Shimlas as the defending champions failed to qualify for the semi-finals, finishing in fifth spot. He scored a second try during the season – in a 33–27 victory in Round Thirteen – as the Free State XV finished in sixth spot on the log.

In November 2016, Vidima was named in the  Super Rugby team's training squad as the team prepared for the 2017 Super Rugby season.

References

1995 births
Living people
Border Bulldogs players
Free State Cheetahs players
Rugby union flankers
Rugby union locks
Rugby union players from Durban
South African rugby union players
Sharks (Currie Cup) players